Hanky Panky may refer to:

Music
 Hanky Panky (Hank Jones album), 1975
 Hanky Panky (The The album), 1995
 Hanky Panky (Tommy James and the Shondells album), 1966
 "Hanky Panky" (Tommy James and the Shondells song), 1966 (originally recorded by The Raindrops in 1963)
 "Hanky Panky" (Madonna song), 1990
 "Hanky Panky", an instrumental by Dexter Gordon from Clubhouse, 1965
 "Hanky Panky", a song by Tracey Dey, 1965

Film and television
 Hanky Panky (1979 film) or Gol Maal, an Indian Hindi-language comedy directed by Hrishikesh Mukherjee
 Hanky Panky (1982 film), an American comedy thriller directed by Sidney Poitier
 Hanky Panky (2017 film), a Taiwanese comedy directed by Huang Chao-liang
 "Hanky Panky" (King of the Hill), a television episode

Other uses
 Hanky panky (cocktail), a variation on the sweet martini
 Henk Schiffmacher or Hanky Panky (born 1952), Dutch tattoo artist
 Hanky Panky (painting), a 2020 painting by Kent Monkman

See also
 Hokkani boro or hakk'ni panki, a Romany expression meaning "great trick"